

The Masquito M80 was a Belgian two-seat ultralight helicopter designed and built by Masquito Aircraft.

Design and development
The prototype was designated the Maschelin M58 Masquito. It was a conventional pod and boom design and was powered by a  Rotax 582 engine driving a two-bladed main rotor and a two-bladed tail rotor. It had two side-by-side seats and was fitted with two fixed skids as a landing gear. The M58 first flew in May 1996; it was later modified to the proposed production standard with a Jabiru 2200 engine and re-designated the M80. Three further M80 prototypes were built but the type failed to gain the appropriate certification and no others were produced.

A Belgian company, D-Motor was set up to design and build a suitable motor for the M80.  Two engines with a high power-to-weight ratio were produced: first, the D-Motor LF26 (a  flat four) and, later, the D-Motor LF39 (a  flat-six).  Unlike the Jabiru motor, these Belgian horizontally-opposed engines have fuel-injection, liquid-cooling and, having side-valves, are ultra-compact, .

Variants
Maschelin M58 Masquito
Prototype with a Rotax 582 engine.
Masquito M80
Production variant with a Jabiru 2200 engine.

Specifications (M80)

See also

References

Notes

Bibliography

 

1990s Belgian helicopters